The Houston Astros' 1996 season was a season in American baseball. It involved the Houston Astros attempting to win the National League Central. The Astros finished in second place in the NL Central with an 82-80 record, six games behind the St. Louis Cardinals.

Offseason
 January 5, 1996: Anthony Young was signed as a free agent by the Astros.

Regular season
On May 7 against Philadelphia, Jeff Bagwell reached the 500th run batted in (RBI) of his career with two home runs and four RBI.  By hitting his second upper-deck home run at Three Rivers Stadium on May 29 – it travelled  – Bagwell joined longtime Pirate Willie Stargell as the only players to homer twice into the stadium's upper deck.  For the month of May, he batted .360 with .740 SLG, 10 HR, 31 RBI, scored 22 runs, and stole four bases.  He was named NL Player of the Month, his fourth career monthly award.  On June 14, Bagwell tied a major league record with four doubles in one game against San Francisco.

The Astros retired Nolan Ryan's number 34 on September 29, 1996.

Season standings

Record vs. opponents

Game log

|- bgcolor="ffbbbb"
| 1 || April 1 || Dodgers || 3–4 || Martinez || Reynolds (0–1) || Worrell || 34,375 || 0–1
|- bgcolor="ccffcc"
| 2 || April 2 || Dodgers || 5–4 || Jones (1–0) || Cummings || — || 20,492 || 1–1
|- bgcolor="ccffcc"
| 3 || April 3 || Dodgers || 5–2 || Hampton (1–0) || Nomo || Jones (1) || 14,858 || 2–1
|- bgcolor="ffbbbb"
| 4 || April 5 || Padres || 4–10 || Tewksbury || Kile (0–1) || — || 28,629 || 2–2
|- bgcolor="ffbbbb"
| 5 || April 6 || Padres || 4–8 (13) || Hoffman || Small (0–1) || — || 24,510 || 2–3
|- bgcolor="ffbbbb"
| 6 || April 7 || Padres || 2–17 || Bergman || Swindell (0–1) || — || 16,258 || 2–4
|- bgcolor="ccffcc"
| 7 || April 8 || Giants || 6–2 || Hampton (2–0) || VanLandingham || — || 13,488 || 3–4
|- bgcolor="ffbbbb"
| 8 || April 9 || Giants || 1–3 (10) || Juden || Tabaka (0–1) || Beck || 13,588 || 3–5
|- bgcolor="ffbbbb"
| 9 || April 10 || Giants || 5–11 || Fernandez || Kile (0–2) || — || 14,183 || 3–6
|- bgcolor="ccffcc"
| 10 || April 11 || @ Reds || 9–4 || Reynolds (1–1) || Portugal || — || 18,946 || 4–6
|- bgcolor="ccffcc"
| 11 || April 12 || @ Reds || 10–8 (10) || Jones (2–0) || Moore || Tabaka (1) || 24,960 || 5–6
|- bgcolor="ffbbbb"
| 12 || April 14 || @ Reds || 3–5 || Schourek || Hampton (2–1) || Brantley || — || 5–7
|- bgcolor="ffbbbb"
| 13 || April 14 || @ Reds || 8–9 || Shaw || Young (0–1) || Brantley || 21,552 || 5–8
|- bgcolor="ccffcc"
| 14 || April 16 || @ Mets || 9–6 || Reynolds (2–1) || Isringhausen || Jones (2) || 13,795 || 6–8
|- bgcolor="ccffcc"
| 15 || April 17 || @ Mets || 7–5 || Kile (1–2) || Wilson || Jones (3) || 12,065 || 7–8
|- bgcolor="ccffcc"
| 16 || April 19 || Reds || 13–5 || Brocail (1–0) || Schourek || — || 22,728 || 8–8
|- bgcolor="ffbbbb"
| 17 || April 20 || Reds || 1–6 || Smiley || Drabek (0–1) || — || 34,098 || 8–9
|- bgcolor="ccffcc"
| 18 || April 21 || Reds || 7–5 || Jones (3–0) || Brantley || — || 27,845 || 9–9
|- bgcolor="ccffcc"
| 19 || April 22 || @ Giants || 11–8 || Reynolds (3–1) || Leiter || — || 8,867 || 10–9
|- bgcolor="ccffcc"
| 20 || April 23 || @ Giants || 8–4 || Kile (2–2) || VanLandingham || — || 8,439 || 11–9
|- bgcolor="ffbbbb"
| 21 || April 24 || @ Dodgers || 2–5 || Valdez || Brocail (1–1) || — || 26,666 || 11–10
|- bgcolor="ffbbbb"
| 22 || April 25 || @ Dodgers || 4–6 || Nomo || Drabek (0–2) || Worrell || 33,530 || 11–11
|- bgcolor="ffbbbb"
| 23 || April 26 || @ Padres || 2–3 || Worrell || Hampton (2–2) || Hoffman || 21,254 || 11–12
|- bgcolor="ccffcc"
| 24 || April 27 || @ Padres || 6–0 || Reynolds (4–1) || Ashby || — || 38,309 || 12–12
|- bgcolor="ccffcc"
| 25 || April 28 || @ Padres || 3–2 || Kile (3–2) || Bergman || Jones (4) || 27,208 || 13–12
|- bgcolor="ffbbbb"
| 26 || April 29 || @ Padres || 0–2 || Hamilton || Brocail (1–2) || — || 8,979 || 13–13
|- bgcolor="ffbbbb"
| 27 || April 30 || Braves || 5–7 || Smoltz || Jones (3–1) || McMichael || 17,795 || 13–14
|-

|- bgcolor="ccffcc"
| 28 || May 1 || Braves || 3–0 || Hampton (3–2) || Avery || — || 18,546 || 14–14
|- bgcolor="ccffcc"
| 29 || May 3 || Expos || 4–1 || Reynolds (5–1) || Cormier || Jones (5) || 19,633 || 15–14
|- bgcolor="ffbbbb"
| 30 || May 4 || Expos || 1–2 || Veres || Hernandez (0–1) || Rojas || 22,810 || 15–15
|- bgcolor="ffbbbb"
| 31 || May 5 || Expos || 0–5 || Fassero || Brocail (1–3) || — || 25,207 || 15–16
|- bgcolor="ccffcc"
| 32 || May 6 || @ Phillies || 11–5 || Drabek (1–2) || Hunter || — || 15,906 || 16–16
|- bgcolor="ccffcc"
| 33 || May 7 || @ Phillies || 7–5 || Young (1–1) || Springer || Jones (6) || 16,569 || 17–16
|- bgcolor="ffbbbb"
| 34 || May 8 || @ Phillies || 1–2 (10) || Ryan || Tabaka (0–2) || — || 16,284 || 17–17
|- bgcolor="ccffcc"
| 35 || May 9 || @ Expos || 11–4 || Kile (4–2) || Rueter || — || 12,470 || 18–17
|- bgcolor="ffbbbb"
| 36 || May 10 || @ Expos || 2–5 || Fassero || Dougherty (0–1) || Rojas || 30,315 || 18–18
|- bgcolor="ffbbbb"
| 37 || May 11 || @ Expos || 9–10 (13) || Dyer || Dougherty (0–2) || — || 26,084 || 18–19
|- bgcolor="ffbbbb"
| 38 || May 12 || @ Expos || 6–7 || Urbina || Hampton (3–3) || Rojas || 19,345 || 18–20
|- bgcolor="ffbbbb"
| 39 || May 13 || @ Cubs || 0–6 || Trachsel || Reynolds (5–2) || — || 22,610 || 18–21
|- bgcolor="ccffcc"
| 40 || May 14 || @ Cubs || 6–3 || Kile (5–2) || Navarro || Jones (7) || 17,562 || 19–21
|- bgcolor="ccffcc"
| 41 || May 15 || @ Cubs || 7–5 || Wall (1–0) || Castillo || Jones (8) || 16,093 || 20–21
|- bgcolor="ffbbbb"
| 42 || May 16 || @ Cubs || 1–13 || Telemaco || Drabek (1–3) || — || 15,902 || 20–22
|- bgcolor="ccffcc"
| 43 || May 17 || Pirates || 4–2 || Reynolds (6–2) || Lieber || Jones (9) || 22,882 || 21–22
|- bgcolor="ffbbbb"
| 44 || May 18 || Pirates || 1–2 (11) || Cordova || Young (1–2) || Plesac || 21,010 || 21–23
|- bgcolor="ccffcc"
| 45 || May 19 || Pirates || 4–3 || Jones (4–1) || Lieber || — || 18,815 || 22–23
|- bgcolor="ffbbbb"
| 46 || May 20 || Cardinals || 3–5 || Osborne || Drabek (1–4) || — || 14,547 || 22–24
|- bgcolor="ffbbbb"
| 47 || May 21 || Cardinals || 2–8 || Stottlemyre || Reynolds (6–3) || — || 17,935 || 22–25
|- bgcolor="ffbbbb"
| 48 || May 22 || Cardinals || 2–5 || Benes || Kile (5–3) || Mathews || 15,353 || 22–26
|- bgcolor="ccffcc"
| 49 || May 24 || Cubs || 8–7 (10) || Jones (5–1) || Patterson || — || 23,910 || 23–26
|- bgcolor="ccffcc"
| 50 || May 25 || Cubs || 5–2 || Drabek (2–4) || Navarro || Jones (10) || 34,326 || 24–26
|- bgcolor="ccffcc"
| 51 || May 26 || Cubs || 7–2 || Reynolds (7–3) || Castillo || — || 33,245 || 25–26
|- bgcolor="ccffcc"
| 52 || May 27 || @ Pirates || 5–3 || Kile (6–3) || Smith || — || 8,906 || 26–26
|- bgcolor="ffbbbb"
| 53 || May 28 || @ Pirates || 5–6 || Miceli || Swindell (0–2) || Cordova || 7,182 || 26–27
|- bgcolor="ccffcc"
| 54 || May 29 || @ Pirates || 7–4 || Morman (1–0) || Darwin || Jones (11) || 11,679 || 27–27
|- bgcolor="ffbbbb"
| 55 || May 31 || @ Cardinals || 4–6 || Osborne || Swindell (0–3) || Fossas || 37,625 || 27–28
|-

|- bgcolor="ffbbbb"
| 56 || June 1 || @ Cardinals || 4–5 (10) || Bailey || Hernandez (0–2) || — || 34,958 || 27–29
|- bgcolor="ffbbbb"
| 57 || June 2 || @ Cardinals || 0–2 || Stottlemyre || Kile (6–4) || — || 32,703 || 27–30
|- bgcolor="ccffcc"
| 58 || June 4 || Rockies || 16–8 || Hampton (4–3) || Thompson || — || 18,418 || 28–30
|- bgcolor="ccffcc"
| 59 || June 5 || Rockies || 4–1 || Wall (2–0) || Reynoso || — || 14,954 || 29–30
|- bgcolor="ffbbbb"
| 60 || June 6 || Rockies || 7–14 || Ritz || Drabek (2–5) || — || 22,112 || 29–31
|- bgcolor="ccffcc"
| 61 || June 7 || Phillies || 11–5 || Reynolds (8–3) || Crawford || — || 22,585 || 30–31
|- bgcolor="ccffcc"
| 62 || June 8 || Phillies || 7–3 || Wagner (1–0) || Springer || — || 23,739 || 31–31
|- bgcolor="ccffcc"
| 63 || June 9 || Phillies || 2–1 || Young (2–2) || Williams || Jones (12) || 30,180 || 32–31
|- bgcolor="ccffcc"
| 64 || June 10 || @ Rockies || 10–9 || Wall (3–0) || Reynoso || — || 48,007 || 33–31
|- bgcolor="ffbbbb"
| 65 || June 11 || @ Rockies || 5–7 || Alston || Young (2–3) || Ruffin || 48,014 || 33–32
|- bgcolor="ffbbbb"
| 66 || June 12 || @ Rockies || 0–8 || Freeman || Reynolds (8–4) || — || 48,024 || 33–33
|- bgcolor="ffbbbb"
| 67 || June 13 || @ Giants || 8–12 || Leiter || Kile (6–5) || — || 10,527 || 33–34
|- bgcolor="ccffcc"
| 68 || June 14 || @ Giants || 9–1 || Hampton (5–3) || VanLandingham || Wagner (1) || 10,758 || 34–34
|- bgcolor="ccffcc"
| 69 || June 15 || @ Giants || 4–3 || Wall (4–0) || Watson || Jones (13) || 18,530 || 35–34
|- bgcolor="ffbbbb"
| 70 || June 16 || @ Giants || 7–8 || DeLucia || Morman (1–1) || — || 27,624 || 35–35
|- bgcolor="ccffcc"
| 71 || June 17 || Reds || 5–4 || Young (3–3) || Shaw || Jones (14) || 24,977 || 36–35
|- bgcolor="ffbbbb"
| 72 || June 18 || Reds || 4–6 (10) || Brantley || Hernandez (0–3) || — || 20,505 || 36–36
|- bgcolor="ffbbbb"
| 73 || June 19 || Reds || 7–10 || Portugal || Hampton (5–4) || Brantley || 38,218 || 36–37
|- bgcolor="ccffcc"
| 74 || June 20 || @ Dodgers || 4–2 || Wall (5–0) || Nomo || Jones (15) || 49,656 || 37–37
|- bgcolor="ccffcc"
| 75 || June 21 || @ Dodgers || 11–3 || Drabek (3–5) || Candiotti || — || 33,273 || 38–37
|- bgcolor="ffbbbb"
| 76 || June 22 || @ Dodgers || 0–3 || Martinez || Reynolds (8–5) || — || 37,844 || 38–38
|- bgcolor="ffbbbb"
| 77 || June 23 || @ Dodgers || 3–4 || Worrell || Hernandez (0–4) || — || 35,467 || 38–39
|- bgcolor="ccffcc"
| 78 || June 25 || @ Padres || 9–4 || Jones (6–1) || Sanders || — || 13,458 || 39–39
|- bgcolor="ccffcc"
| 79 || June 26 || @ Padres || 4–3 || Wall (6–0) || Worrell || Wagner (2) || 12,388 || 40–39
|- bgcolor="ffbbbb"
| 80 || June 28 || Mets || 2–7 || Clark || Drabek (3–6) || Henry || 24,569 || 40–40
|- bgcolor="ccffcc"
| 81 || June 29 || Mets || 9–1 || Reynolds (9–5) || Person || — || 35,454 || 41–40
|- bgcolor="ccffcc"
| 82 || June 30 || Mets || 9–3 || Kile (7–5) || Isringhausen || — || 35,981 || 42–40
|-

|- bgcolor="ccffcc"
| 83 || July 1 || Marlins || 6–2 || Hampton (6–4) || Brown || — || 18,513 || 43–40
|- bgcolor="ccffcc"
| 84 || July 2 || Marlins || 4–3 (12) || Johnstone (1–0) || Mathews || — || 18,897 || 44–40
|- bgcolor="ccffcc"
| 85 || July 3 || Marlins || 4–3 || Drabek (4–6) || Leiter || Jones (16) || 24,537 || 45–40
|- bgcolor="ccffcc"
| 86 || July 4 || @ Braves || 5–2 || Reynolds (10–5) || Smoltz || Hernandez (1) || 49,060 || 46–40
|- bgcolor="ccffcc"
| 87 || July 5 || @ Braves || 7–1 || Kile (8–5) || Schmidt || — || 36,896 || 47–40
|- bgcolor="ffbbbb"
| 88 || July 6 || @ Braves || 2–4 || Bielecki || Hampton (6–5) || — || 41,619 || 47–41
|- bgcolor="ffbbbb"
| 89 || July 7 || @ Braves || 1–9 || Maddux || Wall (6–1) || — || 28,716 || 47–42
|- bgcolor="ffbbbb"
| 90 || July 11 || @ Mets || 2–8 || Clark || Drabek (4–7) || — || 18,557 || 47–43
|- bgcolor="ccffcc"
| 91 || July 12 || @ Mets || 3–1 || Reynolds (11–5) || Jones || Wagner (3) || 17,405 || 48–43
|- bgcolor="ccffcc"
| 92 || July 14 || @ Mets || 7–5 (11) || Hernandez (1–4) || Mlicki || Jones (17) || — || 49–43
|- bgcolor="ffbbbb"
| 93 || July 14 || @ Mets || 3–10 || Harnisch || Hampton (6–6) || — || 33,505 || 49–44
|- bgcolor="ffbbbb"
| 94 || July 15 || @ Marlins || 5–15 || Pall || Wall (6–2) || — || 15,807 || 49–45
|- bgcolor="ffbbbb"
| 95 || July 16 || @ Marlins || 2–3 || Perez || Jones (6–2) || — || 15,610 || 49–46
|- bgcolor="ffbbbb"
| 96 || July 17 || @ Marlins || 2–11 || Leiter || Reynolds (11–6) || — || 16,345 || 49–47
|- bgcolor="ffbbbb"
| 97 || July 18 || Braves || 2–3 || Smoltz || Jones (6–3) || Wohlers || 35,822 || 49–48
|- bgcolor="ccffcc"
| 98 || July 19 || Braves || 7–6 || Kile (9–5) || Woodall || Wagner (4) || 39,090 || 50–48
|- bgcolor="ccffcc"
| 99 || July 20 || Braves || 2–1 || Wagner (2–0) || Maddux || — || 49,674 || 51–48
|- bgcolor="ccffcc"
| 100 || July 21 || Braves || 4–3 (10) || Hernandez (2–4) || McMichael || — || 45,561 || 52–48
|- bgcolor="ccffcc"
| 101 || July 22 || Padres || 1–0 || Reynolds (12–6) || Hamilton || Wagner (5) || 21,563 || 53–48
|- bgcolor="ffbbbb"
| 102 || July 23 || Padres || 4–7 || Sanders || Hampton (6–7) || Hoffman || 19,620 || 53–49
|- bgcolor="ccffcc"
| 103 || July 24 || Padres || 6–4 (10) || Hernandez (3–4) || Villone || — || 19,168 || 54–49
|- bgcolor="ccffcc"
| 104 || July 26 || Dodgers || 4–3 || Darwin (1–0) || Guthrie || Wagner (6) || 27,089 || 55–49
|- bgcolor="ffbbbb"
| 105 || July 27 || Dodgers || 5–6 (11) || Osuna || Clark (0–1) || Worrell || 36,841 || 55–50
|- bgcolor="ccffcc"
| 106 || July 28 || Dodgers || 3–2 || Darwin (2–0) || Eischen || — || 32,912 || 56–50
|- bgcolor="ccffcc"
| 107 || July 29 || @ Reds || 2–1 || Hampton (7–7) || Portugal || Wagner (7) || 22,163 || 57–50
|- bgcolor="ffbbbb"
| 108 || July 30 || @ Reds || 4–5 (10) || Shaw || Clark (0–2) || — || 27,015 || 57–51
|- bgcolor="ffbbbb"
| 109 || July 31 || @ Reds || 0–10 || Smiley || Wall (6–3) || — || 26,082 || 57–52
|-

|- bgcolor="ccffcc"
| 110 || August 2 || Giants || 5–1 || Drabek (5–7) || Gardner || Hernandez (2) || 22,682 || 58–52
|- bgcolor="ccffcc"
| 111 || August 3 || Giants || 4–1 || Reynolds (13–6) || Estes || — || 35,930 || 59–52
|- bgcolor="ccffcc"
| 112 || August 4 || Giants || 7–6 || Hampton (8–7) || Fernandez || Wagner (8) || 33,646 || 60–52
|- bgcolor="ffbbbb"
| 113 || August 6 || Expos || 5–7 || Fassero || Kile (9–6) || Rojas || 17,658 || 60–53
|- bgcolor="ffbbbb"
| 114 || August 7 || Expos || 5–13 || Leiter || Wall (6–4) || — || 19,703 || 60–54
|- bgcolor="ccffcc"
| 115 || August 8 || Expos || 6–2 || Drabek (6–7) || Martinez || — || 26,632 || 61–54
|- bgcolor="ccffcc"
| 116 || August 9 || @ Phillies || 5–1 || Reynolds (14–6) || West || — || 21,780 || 62–54
|- bgcolor="ccffcc"
| 117 || August 10 || @ Phillies || 3–1 || Hampton (9–7) || Schilling || Wagner (9) || 18,486 || 63–54
|- bgcolor="ccffcc"
| 118 || August 11 || @ Phillies || 10–5 || Kile (10–6) || Williams || — || 24,150 || 64–54
|- bgcolor="ffbbbb"
| 119 || August 12 || @ Expos || 1–8 || Leiter || Darwin (2–1) || — || 35,458 || 64–55
|- bgcolor="ffbbbb"
| 120 || August 13 || @ Expos || 4–7 || Martinez || Drabek (6–8) || Rojas || 17,103 || 64–56
|- bgcolor="ccffcc"
| 121 || August 14 || @ Expos || 8–3 || Reynolds (15–6) || Cormier || — || 19,136 || 65–56
|- bgcolor="ccffcc"
| 122 || August 16 || @ Cubs || 8–3 || Hampton (10–7) || Castillo || — || 37,139 || 66–56
|- bgcolor="ffbbbb"
| 123 || August 17 || @ Cubs || 3–12 || Trachsel || Kile (10–7) || — || 39,775 || 66–57
|- bgcolor="ffbbbb"
| 124 || August 18 || @ Cubs || 8–10 || Navarro || Brocail (1–4) || Wendell || 37,210 || 66–58
|- bgcolor="ccffcc"
| 125 || August 19 || Pirates || 2–1 (13) || Morman (2–1) || Morel || — || 15,067 || 67–58
|- bgcolor="ccffcc"
| 126 || August 20 || Pirates || 9–4 || Wall (7–4) || Miceli || Hernandez (3) || 19,866 || 68–58
|- bgcolor="ffbbbb"
| 127 || August 21 || Pirates || 2–5 || Neagle || Hampton (10–8) || Ericks || 13,357 || 68–59
|- bgcolor="ffbbbb"
| 128 || August 22 || Pirates || 6–8 || Wilkins || Wagner (2–1) || Ericks || 14,899 || 68–60
|- bgcolor="ffbbbb"
| 129 || August 23 || Cardinals || 0–1 || Osborne || Kile (10–8) || Eckersley || 35,554 || 68–61
|- bgcolor="ccffcc"
| 130 || August 24 || Cardinals || 3–1 || Reynolds (16–6) || Stottlemyre || — || 43,258 || 69–61
|- bgcolor="ccffcc"
| 131 || August 25 || Cardinals || 4–1 || Wall (8–4) || Benes || Hernandez (4) || 31,609 || 70–61
|- bgcolor="ffbbbb"
| 132 || August 26 || Cardinals || 2–3 || Benes || Hampton (10–9) || Eckersley || 21,624 || 70–62
|- bgcolor="ccffcc"
| 133 || August 27 || Cubs || 6–5 || Morman (3–1) || Adams || Hernandez (5) || 15,374 || 71–62
|- bgcolor="ccffcc"
| 134 || August 28 || Cubs || 5–4 || Olson (1–0) || Bottenfield || — || 18,026 || 72–62
|- bgcolor="ffbbbb"
| 135 || August 29 || Cubs || 3–4 || Navarro || Reynolds (16–7) || Wendell || 16,151 || 72–63
|- bgcolor="ccffcc"
| 136 || August 30 || @ Pirates || 10–0 || Wall (9–4) || Peters || — || 24,619 || 73–63
|- bgcolor="ccffcc"
| 137 || August 31 || @ Pirates || 5–4 || Hernandez (4–4) || Ericks || Hudek (1) || 27,559 || 74–63
|-

|- bgcolor="ffbbbb"
| 138 || September 1 || @ Pirates || 5–9 || Wainhouse || Darwin (2–2) || — || 14,144 || 74–64
|- bgcolor="ffbbbb"
| 139 || September 2 || @ Cardinals || 7–8 (10) || Benes || Brocail (1–5) || — || 32,955 || 74–65
|- bgcolor="ffbbbb"
| 140 || September 3 || @ Cardinals || 3–12 || Stottlemyre || Reynolds (16–8) || — || 23,955 || 74–66
|- bgcolor="ffbbbb"
| 141 || September 4 || @ Cardinals || 4–6 || Benes || Wall (9–5) || Eckersley || 34,891 || 74–67
|- bgcolor="ccffcc"
| 142 || September 6 || Rockies || 2–1 || Hernandez (5–4) || Leskanic || — || 20,932 || 75–67
|- bgcolor="ccffcc"
| 143 || September 7 || Rockies || 5–4 || Kile (11–8) || Holmes || Hudek (2) || 37,213 || 76–67
|- bgcolor="ffbbbb"
| 144 || September 8 || Rockies || 2–5 || Reed || Reynolds (16–9) || Ruffin || 31,316 || 76–68
|- bgcolor="ffbbbb"
| 145 || September 9 || Rockies || 2–4 || Ritz || Wall (9–6) || Ruffin || 13,833 || 76–69
|- bgcolor="ccffcc"
| 146 || September 10 || Phillies || 4–3 || Morman (4–1) || Schilling || Hernandez (6) || 12,700 || 77–69
|- bgcolor="ffbbbb"
| 147 || September 11 || Phillies || 8–10 || Parrett || Holt (0–1) || Bottalico || 17,300 || 77–70
|- bgcolor="ccffcc"
| 148 || September 12 || Phillies || 4–1 || Kile (12–8) || Williams || — || 16,103 || 78–70
|- bgcolor="ffbbbb"
| 149 || September 13 || @ Rockies || 3–6 || Holmes || Hernandez (5–5) || Ruffin || 48,049 || 78–71
|- bgcolor="ffbbbb"
| 150 || September 14 || @ Rockies || 3–7 || Ritz || Wall (9–7) || — || 48,132 || 78–72
|- bgcolor="ffbbbb"
| 151 || September 15 || @ Rockies || 4–11 || Thompson || Drabek (6–9) || — || 48,038 || 78–73
|- bgcolor="ffbbbb"
| 152 || September 17 || @ Braves || 4–5 || Smoltz || Kile (12–9) || Wohlers || 32,109 || 78–74
|- bgcolor="ffbbbb"
| 153 || September 18 || @ Braves || 2–6 || Maddux || Hampton (10–10) || — || 29,885 || 78–75
|- bgcolor="ffbbbb"
| 154 || September 20 || @ Marlins || 1–3 || Brown || Reynolds (16–10) || Nen || 21,518 || 78–76
|- bgcolor="ffbbbb"
| 155 || September 21 || @ Marlins || 1–2 || Heredia || Wagner (2–2) || — || 31,023 || 78–77
|- bgcolor="ffbbbb"
| 156 || September 22 || @ Marlins || 0–6 || Helling || Kile (12–10) || — || 17,461 || 78–78
|- bgcolor="ffbbbb"
| 157 || September 24 || Mets || 0–4 || Jones || Wall (9–8) || — || 39,511 || 78–79
|- bgcolor="ccffcc"
| 158 || September 25 || Mets || 5–4 (10) || Hudek (1–0) || Wallace || — || 15,760 || 79–79
|- bgcolor="ccffcc"
| 159 || September 26 || Mets || 6–2 || Drabek (7–9) || Trlicek || — || 13,751 || 80–79
|- bgcolor="ffbbbb"
| 160 || September 27 || Marlins || 2–3 || Hutton || Kile (12–11) || Nen || 21,725 || 80–80
|- bgcolor="ccffcc"
| 161 || September 28 || Marlins || 5–1 || Darwin (3–2) || Heredia || — || 21,832 || 81–80
|- bgcolor="ccffcc"
| 162 || September 29 || Marlins || 5–4 (10) || Hudek (2–0) || Hammond || — || 42,658 || 82–80
|-

|-
| Legend:       = Win       = LossBold = Astros team member

Detailed records

Notable transactions
 June 3, 1996: Greg Swindell was released by the Astros.
 June 4, 1996: Roy Oswalt was drafted by the Astros in the 23rd round of the 1996 Major League Baseball draft. Player signed May 18, 1997.
 July 23, 1996: Rich Loiselle was traded by the Astros to the Pittsburgh Pirates for Danny Darwin.
 July 27, 1996: Rick Wilkins and cash were traded by the Astros to the San Francisco Giants for Kirt Manwaring.

Roster

Player stats

Batting

Starters by position 
Note: Pos = Position; G = Games played; AB = At bats; H = Hits; Avg. = Batting average; HR = Home runs; RBI = Runs batted in

Other batters 
Note: G = Games played; AB = At bats; H = Hits; Avg. = Batting average; HR = Home runs; RBI = Runs batted in

Pitching

Starting pitchers 
Note: G = Games pitched; IP = Innings pitched; W = Wins; L = Losses; ERA = Earned run average; SO = Strikeouts

Other pitchers 
Note: G = Games pitched; IP = Innings pitched; W = Wins; L = Losses; ERA = Earned run average; SO = Strikeouts

Relief pitchers 
Note: G = Games pitched; W = Wins; L = Losses; SV = Saves; ERA = Earned run average; SO = Strikeouts

Farm system

LEAGUE CHAMPIONS: Jackson

References

External links
1996 Houston Astros season at Baseball Reference

Houston Astros seasons
Houston Astros season
1996 in sports in Texas
1996 in Houston